Jasmin Repeša (born 1 June 1961) is a Bosnian-born Croatian professional basketball coach and former player whose last coached team was Fortitudo Bologna of the Italian Serie A. 

Repeša has won numerous pro club competitions during his head coaching career, and he was also a somewhat successful basketball player during his youth, while playing for KK Čapljina early on in his pro career.

Early life 
Repeša was a basketball player for his hometown team KK Čapljina during the 1980s.

Coaching career 
On 21 June 2013, Repeša was appointed head coach of Cedevita of the Croatian League. His son Dino was named his assistant. In inaugural season, the club won the domestic league championship and managed to reach the semifinals of the ABA League playoffs. In April 2015 Repeša announced his departure from Cedevita bench at the end of the season, citing health reasons. On 25 June he officially resigned and was replaced with Veljko Mršić, his assistant.

On 26 June 2015, Repeša signed a contract to become the head coach of Italian team Olimpia Milano. In June 2017 he was sacked. On 30 December 2018, Repeša was named the head coach of Budućnost, which role he took after Aleksandar Džikić resigned. In April 2019 following a loss to Crvena zvezda in the ABA League finals, Repeša resigned.

On 23 June 2020, Repeša came back to Italy, signing a deal with Victoria Libertas Pesaro of the LBA. He decided to exit from the contract at the end of the season.

On 24 May 2021, Repeša signed a multi-year contract to come back at Fortitudo Bologna of the Italian Serie A. However, on 26 September 2021, he resigned from his post after only one game of regular season.

Coaching record

EuroLeague 

|- 
| align="left" rowspan=2|Cibona
| align="left"|1995–96
| 16 || 8 || 8 ||  || align="center"|Eliminated in group stage
|- 
| align="left"|1996–97
| 29 || 17 || 12 ||  || align="center"|Eliminated in Top 16 stage
|- 
| align="left"|Tofaş
| align="left"|1999–00
| 26 || 12 || 14 ||  || align="center"|Eliminated in group stage
|- 
| align="left"|Split
| align="left"|2000–01
| 23 || 15 || 8 ||  || align="center"|Eliminated in quarterfinal stage
|- 
| align="left"|Śląsk Wrocław
| align="left"|2001–02
| 4 || 0 || 4 ||  || align="center"|Fired
|- 
| align="left" rowspan=2|Cibona
| align="left"|2001–02
| 8 || 3 || 5 ||  || align="center"|Eliminated in regular season
|- 
| align="left"|2002–03
| 3 || 1 || 2 ||  || align="center"|Fired
|- 
| align="left" rowspan=4|Fortitudo Bologna
| align="left"|2002–03
| 16 || 9 || 7 ||  || align="center"|Eliminated in Top 16 stage
|- 
| align="left"|2003–04
| 22 || 14 || 8 ||  || align="center"|Lost in the final game
|- 
| align="left"|2004–05
| 20 || 16 || 4 ||  || align="center"|Eliminated in Top 16 stage
|- 
| align="left"|2005–06
| 20 || 12 || 8 ||  || align="center"|Eliminated in Top 16 stage
|- 
| align="left" rowspan=3|Virtus Roma
| align="left"|2006–07
| 20 || 7 || 13 ||  || align="center"|Eliminated in Top 16 stage
|- 
| align="left"|2007–08
| 20 || 8 || 12 ||  || align="center"|Eliminated in Top 16 stage
|- 
| align="left"|2008–09
| 6 || 5 || 1 ||  || align="center"|Resigned
|- 
| align="left"|Unicaja
| align="left"|2012–13
| 24 || 15 || 9 ||  || align="center"|Eliminated in Top 16 stage
|- 
| align="left"|Cedevita
| align="left"|2014–15
| 10 || 3 || 7 ||  || align="center"|Eliminated in regular season
|- 
| align="left" rowspan=2|Olimpia Milano
| align="left"|2015–16
| 10 || 3 || 7 ||  || align="center"|Eliminated in regular season
|- 
| align="left"|2016–17
| 30 || 8 || 22 ||  || align="center"|Eliminated in regular season
|- 
| align="left"|Budućnost
| align="left"|2018–19
| 15 || 3 || 12 ||  || align="center"|Eliminated in regular season
|-class="sortbottom"
| align="center" colspan=2|Career||322||159||163||||

National team coaching career 

In 2005 after Croatia's unsuccessful EuroBasket tournament, Neven Spahija resigned from the national team bench and Repeša took the head coach role. He led the squad at the 2007 EuroBasket, 2008 Summer Olympic Games and at the 2009 EuroBasket.

On 9 February 2012, following the unsuccessful 2011 EuroBasket, Repeša took Croatia bench the second time in his coaching career, this time instead of Josip Vranković, leading the team at the 2013 EuroBasket in Slovenia, where Croatia managed to reach the semifinal of that tournament after 18 years; he also led them at the 2014 World Cup in Brazil, after which Repeša parted ways with the Croatian national team. 

On 2 September 2018, Repeša was named the interim head coach of the Bosnia and Herzegovina national basketball team, after Duško Vujošević resigned due to the health reasons. On 12 November 2018, the Basketball Federation of Bosnia and Herzegovina (KSBiH) named Vedran Bosnić as the permanent head coach of the team.

References

External links 
Jasmin Repeša at euroleague.net

1961 births
Living people
Croats of Bosnia and Herzegovina
Baloncesto Málaga coaches
People from Čapljina
Croatian basketball coaches
Fortitudo Pallacanestro Bologna coaches
KK Cedevita coaches
KK Cibona coaches
Liga ACB head coaches
Olimpia Milano coaches
Pallacanestro Virtus Roma coaches
Pallacanestro Treviso coaches
KK Budućnost coaches